Mike Hodges (born November 14, 1945) is a former American football player and coach.  He served as the head football coach at the University of Massachusetts Amherst from 1992 to 1997, compiling a record of 35–30.

Coaching career
Hodges served as an assistant coach and a defensive coordinator at UMass for 14 years, under three different head coaches.  Following the 1991 season he was named the school's head coach after Jim Reid resigned following budget disagreements with administration.

As head coach, he compiled a 35–30 overall record, including a 36–14 victory over Rhode Island in the 1993 Wild Geese Classic in-season bowl game. The game was held overseas in Limerick, Ireland.  Hodges resigned as coach after a 2–9 season in 1997.

After resigning as head coach, Hodges served as the Director of Football Operations for UMass until his retirement in 2011.  Although Hodges did not produce an overwhelming amount of success as head coach of the Minutemen many fans of the school appreciated his contributions to the program.  Hodges kept the Minutemen competitive at a time when huge budget cuts ravaged the Athletic Department.  Also, many of his recruits were prominent members of the 1998 UMass team that won the Division 1AA National Championship.

Head coaching record

References

1945 births
Living people
Maine Black Bears football players
UMass Minutemen football coaches